The 2011 Buffalo Bills season was the team's 42nd season in the National Football League and its 52nd overall. The Bills improved on their 4–12 record from the 2010 season, winning six games. They won their first three games of the year, which included a victory over New England for their first victory over the Patriots since 2003. However, the team sputtered down the stretch (with a seven game losing streak proving costly), missing the playoffs for the twelfth consecutive season; the team had not made the playoffs since 1999, the longest standing playoff drought in the NFL at the time after the Detroit Lions made the playoffs for the first time since 1999 during this season.

Overview
In week 3 of the season, the Bills broke a 15-game losing streak that the team had accrued against the New England Patriots that dated to opening day of the 2003 season; Buffalo defeated the Patriots, 34–31. In doing so, the 2011 Bills became the only team since before 1950 (when comprehensive statistical record keeping began) to win two consecutive games in which they trailed by at least 18 points; they overcame a 21–3 deficit to Oakland in Week 2 and a 21–0 deficit to New England in Week 3. Incidentally, Buffalo's loss to the Cincinnati Bengals the following week was the Bills' first loss to Cincinnati since the 1988 AFC Championship game; that streak had been the longest winning streak by one team over another after Buffalo snapped their losing streak to New England.

The Bills started the season with a 5–2 record, positioned to make the playoffs, before losing eight of their final nine games, eliminating them from the playoffs. Wide receiver Stevie Johnson set a franchise mark as the only receiver in Bills history to record two consecutive 1,000-yard seasons. No other Bills receiver – including Andre Reed, James Lofton, Eric Moulds or Lee Evans – had done so. Buffalo's offense only surrendered 23 sacks all season, the fewest in the NFL.

Strong start, weak finish
The Bills were looking to make the playoffs for the first time since 1999, and enjoyed a 3–0 start, including a 21-point comeback against the New England Patriots in week 3. However, after a dominating Week Eight shutout win over Washington in Toronto (their only victory north of the border, as their Toronto Series was cancelled after the 2013 season), improving the team's record to 5-2, the remainder of the Bills' season was plagued by injuries to key starters. As a result, Buffalo suffered a seven-game losing streak to the New York Jets (twice), Dallas Cowboys, Miami Dolphins (twice), Tennessee Titans and San Diego Chargers, with the Week 14 loss to San Diego eliminating the team from postseason contention. With the Detroit Lions earning a playoff spot in Week 16, and the Houston Texans winning the AFC South in 2011, the Bills took sole possession of the NFL's longest current playoff drought, at 12 and counting.

The 2011 losing streak was eventually broken by defeating the Denver Broncos on Christmas Eve, a game that was blacked out in Western New York due to poor ticket sales. In the first seven games of the season (of which the Bills won five), the Bills had a +9 turnover differential (18 takeaways, 9 giveaways); from Week 9 until the end of the season, the Bills gave the ball away 21 times, with only 12 takeaways. Quarterback Ryan Fitzpatrick started the season strongly, posting a 97.8 passer rating and a 14/7 touchdown-interception ratio through the first seven games; in the final nine games, Fitzpatrick threw ten touchdowns and 16 interceptions, with a 66.5 quarterback rating in that span. His 23 total interceptions were the most thrown by any quarterback in the league in 2011. He threw only 5 interceptions total in the Bills' six wins and 18 in their ten losses. Bills wide receiver David Nelson stated that Fitzpatrick was injured by Redskins linebacker London Fletcher in Week 8, the last win before the losing streak began. Said Nelson, "A lot of people don't know, but Fitz during the Washington game actually cracked a couple of ribs. So after that, he was playing hurt."

Key injuries
Notable injuries included linebacker Shawne Merriman, center Eric Wood, cornerback Terrence McGee, star nose tackle Kyle Williams (as well as backup Torell Troup) and star running back Fred Jackson, all of whom were placed on injured reserve to end their respective seasons. The Bills also lost two wide receivers that did not contribute significantly during the 2011 season, Marcus Easley and Roscoe Parrish, to IR (the former missing his second full season, the latter coming off a strong 2010 season) and two kickers, incumbent starter Rian Lindell and replacement Dave Rayner; the Bills were compelled to sign a third-string kicker, Brandon Coutu, for the final game of the 2011 season against New England. Rookie Marcell Dareus also admitted to playing much of the season with numerous injuries, but continued to stay on the field out of a personal obligation to the team. Starting quarterback Ryan Fitzpatrick also sustained an undisclosed injury as stated above, but was never listed on the injury report (nor was the injury ever specified) and Fitzpatrick continued to play the rest of the season.

Offseason

Uniform change
On February 9, 2011, the Bills announced that the team planned to introduce redesigned uniforms for the  season. No details were given on what the uniforms would look like, but it was said that the charging buffalo logo would be kept. Later reports leaked by a Madden NFL 12 trailer, and said to be confirmed by the league, indicated the team would be adopting the uniforms the team wore between 1975 and 1983. It was also announced that an official unveiling of the new uniforms would be at a fan appreciation event later in the summer. The uniforms were unveiled on June 24, 2011. The team also announced that the U.S. military will be involved in the unveiling.

Due to the 2011 NFL lockout that ran from March 11 – July 25, actual Bills' players were prohibited from attending the event. Instead, models from the New York National Guard, along with former Bills' Jim Kelly and Thurman Thomas, modeled the new uniforms. This was the first full redesign of the team’s uniforms since the  season.

The Bills wore their white jerseys at home against the New York Jets in Week Nine.

Draft

 The Bills acquired this fourth-round selection and a 2012 conditional draft selection in an October 2010 trade that sent RB Marshawn Lynch to the Seattle Seahawks.
 Compensatory selection.

Staff

Final roster

Schedule

Preseason

Regular season

Note: Intra-division opponents are in bold text.
 #  Indicates the game was part of the Bills Toronto Series.

Game summaries

Week 1

    
    
    
    
    
    
    
    

With the win, the Bills start 1-0.

Week 2

Week 3

    
    
    
    
    
    
    
    
    
    
    

With the stunning win, the Bills improved to 3-0.

Week 4

Week 5

Week 6

Week 8

Week 9

Week 10

Week 11

    
    
    
    
    
    
    

Trying to snap a two-game losing streak, the Bills flew to Sun Life Stadium for a Week 11 AFC East showdown with the Miami Dolphins.  Buffalo delivered the game's opening punch in the first quarter with a 30-yard field goal from kicker Dave Rayner, but the Dolphins answered with quarterback Matt Moore completing a 1-yard touchdown pass to tight end Anthony Fasano, followed by running back Reggie Bush getting a 5-yard touchdown run.  Miami added onto their lead in the second quarter with Moore completing a 12-yard touchdown pass to fullback Charles Clay and a 4-yard touchdown pass to wide receiver Davone Bess.  The Bills would close out the half with a 56-yard field goal from Rayner.

The Dolphins added onto Buffalo's misery in the third quarter with running back Lex Hilliard recovering a blocked punt in the endzone for a touchdown.  The Bills tried to rally in the fourth quarter as rookie linebacker Kelvin Sheppard tackled running back Daniel Thomas in the endzone for a safety, but Miami's lead proved to be too much to overcome.

With the loss, Buffalo fell to 5–5.

Week 12

Week 13

Week 14

Week 15

Week 16

Week 17

    
    
    
    
    
    
    
    
    
    
    

Buffalo's final game of the season was a 49–21 loss to New England on New Year's Day 2012. In a mirror image of Week Three, the Bills opened a 21–0 on New England, before giving up 49 unanswered points to the high-powered Patriot offense. Head coach Chan Gailey  benched wide receiver Stevie Johnson after Johnson caught a touchdown, then lifted his jersey to reveal "Happy New Year" on his shirt. The touchdown was Johnson's final play of the season as he was benched for the rest of the game. According to Pro-Football-Reference.com, New England, who won by 28, became the first team in NFL history to win a game by more than eight points after trailing by more than 20 points after one quarter. It was also the first time in a two-game season series that the winning team in each game overcame a deficit of more than 17 points. With the loss, the Bills finished with a 6–10 record and secured the 10th pick in the 2012 NFL Draft.

Standings

Notes

References

Buffalo
Buffalo Bills seasons
Buff